Putuo is the Chinese rendering of Sanskrit Potalaka.  It may refer to the following places in China:

Mount Putuo, one of the four Buddhist holy mountains of China
Putuo District, Zhoushan, Zhejiang Province: location of Mount Putuo
Putuo District, Shanghai
Putuo Zongcheng Temple, in Chengde, Hebei Province
South Putuo Temple, in Xiamen, Fujian Province